Vidyalankara Institute of Technology (VIT) is an engineering college affiliated to the University of Mumbai and approved by the All India Council For Technical Education (AICTE) and , India. It was accredited by National Assessment and Accreditation Council in 2019.

Vidyalankara Institute of Technology was started in the year 1999 after having secured permission from the AICTE and University of Mumbai. It caters to students who have passed the Maharashtra State Board's HSC and CET examinations and desire to take up engineering as their profession. It secured an A grade rating from the Mumbai University in 2005.

History

Established in the year 1999, Vidyalankara Institute of Technology is an Autonomous (from A.Y. 2022-23 for period of 10 years) self-financed Engineering Degree and Management college managed by Vidyalankara Dayapreet Trust for imparting a well-coordinated multidisciplinary quality technical education. It is approved by All India Council of Technical Education (AICTE), the Directorate of Technical Education (DTE), Maharashtra state and affiliated to the University of Mumbai.

The Institute currently runs five undergraduate programs, two post graduate programs in Engineering, one post graduate programmed in Management and one PhD programmed, affiliated to the University of Mumbai.

It is awarded with ‘A’ grade certificate by the Maharashtra State Government in 2005. Three of its undergraduate programmers are accredited by National Board of Accreditation for the period of three years with effect from 01 July 2016, and are permanently affiliated to the University of Mumbai, since 2017. It is the recipient of Distinguished College Award at TechNet India 2017 (Annual Academic conference and Awards to Academia, jointly organized by CSI, Mumbai Chapter in association with Spoken Tutorial- FOSSEE at IIT Bombay). The Institute is also accredited by Tata Consultancy Services; VIT is also an Academia Partner with L&T Infotech for its ‘Brand Ambassador Programmer’ and has Mou's with leading organizations. The Institute has been Accredited with a CGPA of 3.41 at A+ Grade by National Assessment & Accreditation Council (NAAC) valid for a period of 5 years from 04 March 2019.

Programs offered 
Currently, the Institute offers graduate and postgraduate programs in Engineering & Management. Following are the details of the programs as of 2022. The college has gone through various phases of expansions over the last few years, and further expansions are also expected.

Undergraduate programs 
Following are the branches in which Bachelor of Technology (B.Tech.) degree of University of Mumbai is offered at VIT:

 Electronics & Telecommunication Engineering: 120 Seats
 Electronics & Computer Science 120 Seats
 Computer Engineering: 120 Seats
 Information Technology: 120 Seats
 Bio-Medical Engineering: 60 Seats

Accreditation: Electronics, Electronics & Telecommunication and Bio-Medical programs are accredited by National Board of Accreditation for 6 years w.e.f  01.07.2016 and shall undergo Cyle 2 of NBA; The Information Technology and Computer Engineering courses are also accredited by NBA in 2022 for 3 Years

Accreditation: Accredited A+ by NAAC in First Cycle with score of 3.41

Post-graduate programs 

The college offers a postgraduate course in MMS (Master of Management Studies), where the degree is conferred by the University of Mumbai. Admission is based on Maharashtra CET (Common Entrance Test) score. The college also offers a Master's program in Computer Engineering, where the degree is conferred by the University of Mumbai.

 Master of Management Studies: 120 Seats
 M.E (Computer Engineering): 12 Seats
 M.E (Electronics and Telecommunication Engineering): 12 Seats

Doctoral programs 
The college offers a Doctoral program in computer engineering, where the degree is conferred by the University of Mumbai.
 Ph.D.(Computer Engineering): 10 Seats

Campus

The campus is located in Wadala (East), a central suburb of Mumbai, and stretches over 11 acres (45,000 m2 or 480,000 sq ft) of land. It is close to some residential complexes like Dosti Acres and Lloyd's Estate.

The campus comprises 3 buildings, 2 gardens, a football field, a Multipurpose court where volleyball, basketball, throwball, handball is played and also a cricket pitch. A canteen and a café both offer a wide range of food and beverages. Also, separate parking lots are available for students and faculty members, for both 2-wheelers and 4-wheelers (only for faculties).

Library

The library provides a wide-ranging collection of books which include university prescribed text books and reference material. The library also subscribes to all major international journals and magazines. Some major non-technical magazines are also subscribed to. The library also has a reading hall which is open 6 days a week and on Sundays when exams are approaching.

Apart from books, the college also provides students with the facility of using the IEEE/IET electronic library (IEL); an online database, which holds more than 3,796,274 full text documents.

Laboratories

An entire floor of the main building is reserved for laboratories. They include labs maintained by the 5 departments as well as other core departments such as Applied Sciences and Mechanics departments.

In addition to 12 computer laboratories, the Institute has set up a state of the art 'Central Computing Centre'. An area of 300 sq m is dedicated for the Computer Centre. Apart from IBM compatible P4 desktops, the Centre has Apple Mac desktops and Sun Blade Workstations. All these computers are networked and backed up with various legal operating systems & application software along with printing & scanning devices.

Hostel

The Vidyalankara Gurkula, a hostel for boys and girls at Nerul, has been run by the Vidyalankara Dayapreet Trust since June 1996. A total of 131 students (both boys and girls) reside here. A few of the students are from the western suburbs of Mumbai, while others come from different states of India. The hostel is located near Nerul railway station, in Sector 17.

Amongst other facilities, the hostel also provides computers with internet facilities, a library consisting of academic and general books, and also carrom and chess boards for recreation.

Achievements and awards
Vidyalankara has won the award for the "Top Institutional Theater Design in the world" at the Interior Design Best of the Year Awards held on the 4 December 2014 at the IAC Building, Manhattan, New York City.
Vidyalankara has won the Honor Award from Design share, New York, USA for its innovative design. The structure boasts of gateless campus, a man-size chess board, an amphitheater and a multi purpose zone for students to chill.
Infosys has selected Vidyalankara as a partner for its Campus-Connect Program, wherein they train pre-final year Vidyalankara students to make them industry ready.
VIT has also spread its wings by a tie up with Penn State University, USA. In this program, students finish the first two years of the B.S. program in VIT and upon achieving the required GPA, finish the later two years of the course at Penn State University.
Recently, Vitina's joined hands with the Indian Development Foundation (Formerly the Indian Leprosy Foundation) to spread awareness of Tuberculosis to the masses.
Vidyalankara Group of Educational Institutes' Friday Paathshala earned recognition nationally by winning a silver in the ‘college contact programme of the year’ category at the 1st WOW Event and Experiential Awards.

Student life

The college has student chapters of various international organizations. It has also set up various development and interaction cells to help students to decide on the path they want to take in the future. The college's annual festivals organized in the Summer semester while smaller events are conducted throughout the year by the student organizations.

Student chapters
Association for Computing Machinery, ACM
CSI 
ISTE
IEI
BMESI-VIT Chapter

Vidyalankara Institute of Technology's Computer Society of India (CSI-VIT) Student Chapter was conferred with the prestigious "Best Accredited Student Branch" Award for 2015-16 at the CSI Annual Convention 2016.  The Institute's CSI Chapter won the "Best Accredited Student Branch" Award for 2013-14, in the past.
IEEE
IETE

Student cells
 Research and Development Cell
 Entrepreneurship Development Cell
 Industry Institute Interaction Cell

Student organizations

Academic:
SC - Student Council
EESA - Electronics Students' Association
ETSA - Electronics and Telecommunications Students' Association
ITSA - Information Technology Students' Association
BMSA - Bio-Medical Students' Association
CESA - Computer Education Students' Association
Non-academic:
Hobby Club Committee
Sports Council
Women Development Committee
Vidyalankara Service Scheme
Personality Enrichment Committee
VIT Volunteering Committee
Administrative Committees
Anti Ragging Committee
Admission Committee
Alumni Committee
Career Counselling Committee
Laboratory Development Committee
Library Committee
Parent Interaction Committee (PIC)
Placement Committee 
Value Added Services
Corporate Communication
Final Year Projects Quality Assurance Committee
Food and Beverages Committee
Staff Development Committee
Staff Welfare Committee

Annual festivals

An inter-collegiate technical festival called Tantra Vihar is held in April/May every year. Registrations for various events open in mid-March. Events include Robotics, Technical Paper Presentations, Debates, Quizzes, Open Software competitions, Stock Market Simulation competitions etc.
An intra-collegiate cultural festival called VERVE is held in February/March every year. Some events like Dance Competitions, Fashion Show and War of the DJs are held on an inter-collegiate level. It also includes events like Antashia, Ad-Mad show, Press Conference etc.
Every February, an inter-collegiate sports festival is held in the college campus, including both indoor and outdoor sports. The highlight of the festival is the S6 (Six a side - Six overs) cricket tournament in which more than 15 colleges participate. It also includes intra-collegiate competitions in volleyball, box-cricket, throwball, carrom, chess etc.

V-Express

V-Express is the official annual magazine published by the college. The issue usually comes out in the month of April. The magazine is created by the Student Council of VIT while the editing staff consists of the Literary Council team.

Friday Paata-Shala

Friday Paata-Shala is a platform created for students to indulge in their non academic passions & pursuits. This ranges from dance workshops to screening thought provoking movies and debates to musical jams where students bring their favorite musical instruments. The allotted time is every Friday between 4.30 pm to 6.30pm and the venue is the amphitheater.

Vidyalankara Group of Educational Institute’s ‘Friday Paata-Shala’ earned recognition nationally by winning a silver in the ‘college contact programme of the year’ category at the 1st WOW Event and Experiential Awards.

‘Friday Paathshala’ from being a single college activity has now extended out to all engineering colleges in Mumbai and have involved them in an annual S6 cricket tournament (6 a side, 6 over each). The S6 cricket carnival is now 2 editions old and is becoming a landmark sports event in the annual sports calendar of engineering colleges.

Location
The Vidyalankara campus is situated in Wadala (E) in Central Mumbai, 1 kilometer away from Wadala Road Station. It is located on Vidyalankara College Marg next to residential complexes, Dosti Acres and Lloyd's Estate. The campus is also bordered by the Atop Hill Warehouse company.

See also
 University of Mumbai
 List of Mumbai Colleges
 Wadala

References

External links

Official site of VIT

Engineering colleges in Mumbai
Affiliates of the University of Mumbai
Educational institutions established in 1999
1999 establishments in Maharashtra